Born in Mogadishu, Somalia Mohammed Abdullah Warsame (b. ) is a Canadian citizen who was arrested in 2003 by American police (FBI) in Minneapolis who accused him of attending an Afghan training camp and fighting alongside Taliban forces in the country, and charged him with conspiring to provide support to terrorists.

Life
Warsame emigrated to Canada from Somalia in 1989. In 1995 he married American Fartun Farah in an arranged marriage. While she lived in Minneapolis, Warsame continued to live and work in Toronto; twice travelling to the United States for a three-month period to stay with his wife. In 1998, a daughter named Maryam was born to the couple.

From 2000-2001, Warsame said he was intrigued by the "utopian" society he had heard existed in Afghanistan, and travelled to the country where he attended two Afghan training camps using the kunya name Abu Maryam. He is accused of having sent $2000 to a militant he met at one of the camps and teaching English in the camps and at a nearby medical clinic. He is additionally said to have fought Northern Alliance troops twice to stabilise Taliban control of the country, and to have eaten meals with Osama bin Laden.

In early 2001, Warsame asked a militant leader if the organisation would pay to bring his wife and child over from the United States, but he was informed that he was being asked to leave, and they would pay his April airfare to return to Canada. He reported that he  "grew disillusioned" with the militants, and returned home.

The following year he moved to the United States permanently with his wife and daughter, and enrolled at the Minneapolis Community and Technical College, where he also tutored computer science students.

Arrest

He was approached  by the U.S. Federal Bureau of Investigation (FBI) on December 8, 2003, and volunteered to be interviewed, and told them about his time spent in Afghanistan. He was arrested the following day and held in secret detention at Hennepin County jail for two weeks, during which police registered him under an anonymous name and didn't allow a paper trail when public defender Dan Scott met with Warsame.

He was transferred to New York City, and indicted on January 21, 2004. During this time, he alleges that they tried to convince him to lie and say that Zacarias Moussaoui, whom he had seen at mosque, had confessed to being part of the 9/11 plot to him. When he refused, he says they charged him with supporting terrorism himself.

The FBI originally claimed that he had lied to them, and charged him with providing false information, although he was later listed as having been fully honest with law enforcement from the beginning of his questioning.

His lawyers contend that the nearly six-year wait for his trial is the longest any person has been held without trial in American history. On May 20, 2009, federal prosecutors announced that Warsame pleaded guilty to one count of "conspiring to support al-Qaida", with the remaining charges dismissed.

In May 2009 Warsame pleaded guilty in a plea bargain.
Four of the five charges against him were dropped.
He pleaded guilty to "conspiring to provide material support and resources to Al-Qaida".

According to Warsame's lawyers, he acknowledged attending a training camp, in 2000, but he had not done so out of a desire to engage in Jihad.  Rather, he had initially traveled to Afghanistan under the impression it was a kind of Muslim utopia. He found it wasn't, and wanted to return to his life in North America, but he had run out of funds. He attended the camp because he would be fed there. According to his lawyers he did send funds to someone he had met at the camp. But it wasn't a donation. That individual had loaned him enough money to fly back to Canada. And the funds he sent back were a repayment of that loan.

Namesakes

According to the Minneapolis Star Tribune another Minneapolis man named "Mohammed Warsame"—Ahmed Mohammed Warsame—had his application for US citizenship delayed for over two years due to sharing a name with Mohammed Warsame.
Ahmed Warsame is also born in Somalia.  He emigrated to the US at 17 years old in 1995, and completed his high school education in Minneapolis, where he had lived ever since.

Marilu Cabrera, an immigration official, blamed a two-year delay in the FBI's responses to requests for fingerprint checks for the delay in processing Warsame's application.  She said that 30,000 requests for fingerprint checks submitted in May 2006 had not been processed until 2008.

References

External links
Terror suspect freed upon arrival in Canada: lawyer October 11, 2010

1973 births
Living people
Canadian extrajudicial prisoners of the United States